Mervyn Gordon Rose AM (23 January 1930 – 23 July 2017) was an Australian male tennis player who won seven Grand Slam titles (singles, doubles and mixed doubles).

Rose was born in Coffs Harbour, New South Wales, and turned professional in 1959. He was ranked inside the world's Top 10 throughout much of his tennis career and represented Australia in the Davis Cup from 1951 to 1957. He was ranked World No. 3 in 1958 by Lance Tingay of The Daily Telegraph.

Rose won the singles title at the 1954 Australian Championships in Sydney, defeating compatriot Rex Hartwig in the final in four sets. Four years later, in 1958, he became the French singles champion after a straight-sets victory in the final against Luis Ayala.

He coached numerous female and male players, including Billie Jean King, Margaret Court, Ernie Ewart, Michael Fancutt, Brett Prentice, Arantxa Sánchez Vicario, Eleni Daniilidou, Nadia Petrova, Magdalena Grzybowska and Caroline Schnieder.

Rose was awarded the Australian Sports Medal in 2000, inducted into the International Tennis Hall of Fame in 2001 and the Australian Tennis Hall of Fame in 2002. He was appointed a Member of the Order of Australia (AM) in the 2006 Australia Day Honours for service to tennis, particularly as a competitor at national and international levels and as a coach and mentor to both amateur and professional players. Rose died on 23 July 2017 at the age of 87.

Grand Slam finals

Singles (2 titles, 1 runner-up)

Doubles (4 titles, 7 runners-up)

Mixed doubles: 5 (1 title, 4 runner-ups)

Grand Slam tournament performance timeline

Singles

Other tournament records
Italian Championships
Singles champion: 1958
Mixed Doubles runner-up: 1953, 1955
German Championships
Singles champion: 1957
Men's Doubles champion: 1957
Mixed Doubles champion: 1957
Canadian Championships
Singles champion: 1953
Men's Doubles champion: 1953

References

External links
 
 
 
 
 
 Wimbledon Website. All England Lawn Tennis Club
 Australian Open. Tennis Australia

1930 births
2017 deaths
Australian Championships (tennis) champions
Australian male tennis players
French Championships (tennis) champions
People from Coffs Harbour
Recipients of the Australian Sports Medal
International Tennis Hall of Fame inductees
Tennis people from New South Wales
United States National champions (tennis)
Wimbledon champions (pre-Open Era)
Grand Slam (tennis) champions in men's singles
Grand Slam (tennis) champions in mixed doubles
Grand Slam (tennis) champions in men's doubles
Professional tennis players before the Open Era
Members of the Order of Australia